Ubiquitin carboxyl-terminal hydrolase 40 is an enzyme that in humans is encoded by the USP40 gene.

References

Further reading